Earl of Crawford is one of the most ancient extant titles in Great Britain, having been created in the Peerage of Scotland for Sir David Lindsay in 1398. It is the premier earldom recorded on the Union Roll.

Early history
Sir David Lindsay, who married Elizabeth Stewart, Countess of Crawford, a daughter of Robert II, was the 10th baron of Crawford, Lanarkshire. In 1398 he was given the title of Earl of Crawford, along with Crawford Castle, by Robert.

The title descended to the first Earl's descendants without much incident, until the death of David Lindsay, 8th Earl of Crawford, in 1542. The eighth Earl had a son, Alexander, commonly called the Wicked Master, who frequently quarrelled with his father and even tried to murder him. The Wicked Master was sentenced to death for his crime, and the eighth Earl conveyed his title to a cousin, also called David Lindsay, a descendant of the third Earl of Crawford, and excluded from the succession all of the Wicked Master's descendants. However, the ninth earl, although he had his own sons, named the Wicked Master's son David as his heir; thus, in 1558, at the ninth Earl's death, the earldom returned to the main branch of the family. The ninth Earl is frequently referred to as an interpolated Earl, as are the 17th-22nd Earls.

Later history
At the death of Ludovic Lindsay, 16th Earl of Crawford, the title was passed, despite senior heirs, to a cousin, John, who had already been created Earl of Lindsay. The earldoms of Crawford and Lindsay continued to be united until the 22nd earl died unmarried in January 1808. The two earldoms then became dormant until the respective heirs could prove their claims to the titles.

In 1843, James Lindsay, 7th Earl of Balcarres put forward his claim to the Earldom of Crawford; in 1848, the House of Lords allowed it. The claim was based on the extensive research of his son Lord Lindsay. It was held that the seventh Earl's father, the sixth Earl, was the lawful successor to the earldom of Crawford (though he did not claim it); therefore, the sixth Earl of Balcarres was posthumously declared the 23rd Earl of Crawford, and his son, the seventh Earl of Balcarres, became the 24th Earl of Crawford. Thereafter, these two earldoms have remained united (but the Earldom of Lindsay is separate).

The Earl of Crawford was mentioned in an episode of Keeping Up Appearances, when Hyacinth Bucket insisted that her milk be sourced from the "very attractive herd" on his estate.

The subsidiary titles associated with the Earl of Crawford and Balcarres are: Lord Lindsay of Crawford (created 1398), Lord Lindsay and Balniel (1651) and Baron Wigan of Haigh Hall (1826). The former two subsidiary titles, as well as the two Earldoms, are in the Peerage of Scotland. The Barony is in the Peerage of the United Kingdom. By virtue of the title of Baron Wigan of Haigh Hall, the Earls of Crawford and Balcarres sat in the House of Lords until the passage of the Peerage Act 1963. The 29th Earl sat in the House of Lords as Baron Balniel, a life peerage conferred on him in 1974 after he left the House of Commons and before the death of his father.

The Earl of Crawford is the hereditary Clan Chief of Clan Lindsay.

Family seat
The family seat is Balcarres House in Colinsburgh, Fife. Until the 1940s they were also seated at Haigh Hall, Lancashire.

Earls of Crawford (1398)
David Lindsay, 1st Earl of Crawford (died 1407)
Alexander Lindsay, 2nd Earl of Crawford (c. 1387–1438)
David Lindsay, 3rd Earl of Crawford (died 1445)
Alexander Lindsay, 4th Earl of Crawford (died 1453)
David Lindsay, 1st Duke of Montrose, 5th Earl of Crawford (1440–1495)
John Lindsay, 6th Earl of Crawford (died c. 1513)
Alexander Lindsay, 7th Earl of Crawford (died 1517)
David Lindsay, 8th Earl of Crawford (died 1542)
David Lindsay, 9th Earl of Crawford (died 1558)
David Lindsay, 10th Earl of Crawford (died 1574)
David Lindsay, 11th Earl of Crawford (c. 1547–1607)
David Lindsay, 12th Earl of Crawford (died 1621)
Henry Lindsay, 13th Earl of Crawford (died 1622)
George Lindsay, 14th Earl of Crawford (died 1633)
Alexander Lindsay, 15th Earl of Crawford (died 1639)
Ludovic Lindsay, 16th Earl of Crawford (died 1652)

Earls of Crawford (1642)
John Lindsay, 17th Earl of Crawford, 1st Earl of Lindsay (c. 1598–1678) (descended from 1st Earl's uncle, received Earldom of Crawford under regrant of 1642)
William Lindsay, 18th Earl of Crawford, 2nd Earl of Lindsay (1644–1698)
John Lindsay, 19th Earl of Crawford, 3rd Earl of Lindsay (died 1713)
John Lindsay, 20th Earl of Crawford, 4th Earl of Lindsay (1702–1749)
George Lindsay-Crawford, 21st Earl of Crawford, 5th Earl of Lindsay (1723–1781)
George Lindsay-Crawford, 22nd Earl of Crawford, 6th Earl of Lindsay (1758–1808) (dormant 1808; last male line descendant of 1st Earl of Lindsay, Earldom of Lindsay passed (according to Lords decision in 1878) to a kinsman of 1st Earl of Lindsay and that of Crawford reverted to the senior surviving line, as determined 1848)
Alexander Lindsay, 23rd Earl of Crawford, 6th Earl of Balcarres (1752–1825) (de jure; descended from second son of 3rd Earl of Crawford)
James Lindsay, 24th Earl of Crawford, 7th Earl of Balcarres (1783–1869) (revived 1848)
Alexander Lindsay, 25th Earl of Crawford, 8th Earl of Balcarres (1812–1880)
James Ludovic Lindsay, 26th Earl of Crawford, 9th Earl of Balcarres (1847–1913)
David Alexander Edward Lindsay, 27th Earl of Crawford, 10th Earl of Balcarres (1871–1940)
David Alexander Robert Lindsay, 28th Earl of Crawford, 11th Earl of Balcarres (1900–1975)
Robert Alexander Lindsay, 29th Earl of Crawford, 12th Earl of Balcarres (1927–2023)
Anthony Robert Lindsay, 30th Earl of Crawford, 13th Earl of Balcarres (b. 1958)

The heir apparent is the present holder's son Alexander Thomas Lindsay, Lord Balniel (b. 1991)
The heir apparent’s heir apparent is Hon. Ludovic James Lindsay, Master of Lindsay (b. 2020)

Arms

See also
Lindsay family tree, showing the relationship between some of the above
Clan Lindsay
Crawford Priory
Earl of Balcarres
Earl of Lindsay
Viscount of Garnock

Notes

References

Attribution

Earldoms in the Peerage of Scotland
Noble titles created in 1398
Earl